Justice Hudson may refer to:

Albert Hudson, puisne justice of the Supreme Court of Canada
James H. Hudson, associate justice of the Maine Supreme Judicial Court
Manley Ottmer Hudson, judge of the Permanent Court of International Justice
Natalie Hudson, associate justice of the Minnesota Supreme Court
Robin E. Hudson, associate justice of the North Carolina Supreme Court
Sanford A. Hudson, associate justice of the South Dakota Supreme Court